Elizabeth Drew Stoddard (May 6, 1823 – August 1, 1902) was an American poet and novelist.

Soon after her marriage to Richard Henry Stoddard, the author, she began to publish poems in all the leading magazines, and thereafter, she was a frequent contributor. Her verses were of a high order; she wrote for intellectual readers only. The numerous poems she published in periodicals were not collected in book form until Poems was published in 1895. In addition to her poetical productions, she published three novels: The Morgesons (New York City, 1862); Two Men (1865), and Temple House (1867). Those books did not find a large sale when first published, but a second edition, published in 1888, found a wider circle of readers. They were pictures of New England scenes and characters. In 1874, she published Lolly Dinks's Doings, a juvenile story.

Early life and education
Elizabeth Drew Barstow was born May 6, 1823, in the small coastal town of Mattapoisett, Massachusetts. She received a thorough education in various boarding-schools and in her school-days showed her bent towards poetry and literature in general. She studied at Wheaton Seminary, Norton, Massachusetts.

Career
After her marriage in 1852 to poet Richard Henry Stoddard, the couple settled permanently in New York City, where they belonged to New York's vibrant, close-knit literary and artistic circles. She assisted her husband in his literary work, and contributed stories, poems and essays to the periodicals. Many of her own works were originally published between 1859 and 1890 in such magazines as The Aldine, Harper's Monthly, Harper's Bazaar, and The Atlantic Monthly.

Stoddard is most widely known today as the author of The Morgesons (1862), her first of three novels. Her other two novels are Two Men (1865) and Temple House (1867). Stoddard was also a prolific writer of short stories, children's tales, poems, essays, travel writing, and journalism pieces.

Her work combines the narrative style of the popular nineteenth-century male-centered bildungsroman with the conventions of women's romantic fiction in this revolutionary exploration of the conflict between a woman's instinct, passion, and will, and the social taboos, family allegiances, and traditional New England restraint that inhibit her.

Her most studied work, The Morgesons is set in a small seaport town, and is the dramatic story of Cassandra Morgeson's fight against social and religious norms in a quest for sexual, spiritual, and economic autonomy. An indomitable heroine, Cassandra not only achieves an equal and complete love with her husband and ownership of her family's property, but also masters the skills and accomplishments expected of women. Counterpointed with the stultified lives of her aunt, mother, and sister, Cassandra's success is a striking and radical affirmation of women's power to shape their own destinies. Embodying the convergence of the melodrama and sexual undercurrents of gothic romance and Victorian social realism, The Morgesons marks an important transition in the development of the novel and evoked comparisons during Stoddard's lifetime with such masters as Honoré de Balzac, Leo Tolstoy, George Eliot, the Brontë sisters, and Nathaniel Hawthorne.

One major source of Stoddard's importance to American literature is the historicism of her work, the manner in which her writing embodied and subverted the tension of her present-day culture with the archetypal or received values of the American past.  A pioneering predecessor of regionalist authors Mary Eleanor Wilkins Freeman, Sarah Orne Jewett, and Kate Chopin, as well as a precursor of American modernism, Stoddard's writing is remarkable for its almost total lack of sentimentality, pervasive use of irony, psychological depth of richly drawn characters, intense atmospheric descriptions of New England, concise language, and innovative use of narrative voice and structure. Her investigation of relations between the sexes, a dominant focus of her fiction, analyzes emotions ranging from love and desire to disdain, aggression, and depression.

Selected works

References

Attribution

Further reading

External links

 
 
 
 

1823 births
1902 deaths
People from Mattapoisett, Massachusetts
19th-century American novelists
American women novelists
American women poets
19th-century American poets
19th-century American women writers
Novelists from Massachusetts